L. V. Locsin Building is an 19-storey office building at 6752 Ayala Avenue. Named after its designer, National Artist for Architecture Leandro Locsin, and completed in 1985, it is notable for its Brutalist architectural style and the architect's signature of floating volumes.

Location 
The L. V. Locsin building is located at the southwest corner of Ayala Avenue and Makati Avenue in Makati City, Philippines.  Its location makes it one of the most sought after office address in the Makati Central Business District. Highly accessible via public transportation, it is near famous landmarks in the city, including Makati Shangri-La, Manila Peninsula, Ayala Triangle, Ayala Museum, and Greenbelt.

Amenities
The building is mainly used as an office space, occupants include Mitsubishi Philippines, Leighton Contractors, and Anchor Land Holdings. The podium also houses Sala, a fine dining restaurant.

References

Buildings and structures in Makati
Leandro Locsin buildings
Office buildings in Metro Manila
Office buildings completed in 1985
20th-century architecture in the Philippines